This is a list of defunct airlines of Pakistan.

See also
  Raji Airlines
 List of airlines of Pakistan
 List of airports in Pakistan

References

Pakistan
Airlines
Airlines, defunct